Soul Surfer is a 2011 American biographical drama film directed by Sean McNamara, based on the 2004 autobiography Soul Surfer: A True Story of Faith, Family, and Fighting to Get Back on the Board by Bethany Hamilton about her life as a surfer after losing her left arm in a horrific shark attack and her recovery. The film stars AnnaSophia Robb, Helen Hunt, Dennis Quaid, and Lorraine Nicholson with Carrie Underwood, Kevin Sorbo, Sonya Balmores, Branscombe Richmond, and Craig T. Nelson.

Filming took place in Hawaii in early 2010, with additional filming taking place in Tahiti in August 2010.

Plot

In 2003, 13-year-old Bethany Hamilton lives in Kauai, Hawaii with her parents Tom and Cheri, and two older brothers, Noah and Timmy. All are surfers, but she and her best friend Alana Blanchard have grown up with a passion for the sport and have competed together most of their childhood.

When Bethany and Alana place first and third respectively at a competition, their church youth ministry leader, Sarah Hill, is disappointed Bethany and Alana have to withdraw from a planned mission trip to Mexico in order to train for the Hawaiian Island Regionals contest. On Halloween, Tom goes to the hospital for knee surgery, and the girls go surfing with Alana's father Holt and brother Byron. As Bethany dangles her left arm in the water while she is talking to Alana, a tiger shark unexpectedly attacks and bites off her left arm just below the shoulder. Holt, Alana, and Byron get her out of the water where Holt makes a tourniquet out of his swimshirt to put on her while Byron calls 911 as Cheri is also informed. An ambulance meets them on the way to the hospital. Just before starting Tom's knee surgery, Dr. David Rovinsky is called to the emergency room to treat Bethany. Besides losing her left arm, she also lost over 60% of her blood and Dr. Rovinsky calls her survival a miracle.

The onslaught of paparazzi also proves to be a great strain on her family and their privacy. The Hamiltons are grateful to Holt for his quick and active thinking and decisive action that saved her life. Her injury prevents her from participating in the Rip Curl photo shoots, but she wishes Alana well.

Local fisherman eventually catch and kill the same shark that bit Bethany's arm off, much to Tom's satisfaction when he tests the size of its mouth with the bite size on Bethany's surfboard.

Bethany perseveres and after a recuperation period, gets back in the water, and learns to surf with one arm. Inside Edition offers to provide a prosthetic one that is cosmetically perfect and has bendable joints, in exchange for an interview. She rejects it when she learns it will not help her surf as it is not weight bearing, as a result of the size of her arm stump.

Bethany eventually re-enters the competition, telling rival Malina not to go easy on her, and angrily rejects a five-minute head start offered by the judges. She does not perform well because she cannot stay on the board long enough to go out and catch a competitive wave so Malina wins. Disappointed at this loss, she decides to give up competitive surfing and her friendship with Alana is strained following an argument.

Bethany decides to surprise Sarah by joining the youth group on another mission trip to help the people of Phuket, Thailand who were devastated by the 2004 Indian Ocean tsunami. She joins her youth group to help the Thai children get over their fear of the ocean. They are understandably afraid of the water, including a little boy. She decides to go into it with a surfboard, hoping this will coax him into it. It works, and the realization that she can use her gift to inspire people motivates her to take up surfing again.

Tom, who believes that Bethany possesses a great surfer's instinct for sensing when the best waves will form, rigs a handle on her surfboard which she can use to prevent falling off while paddling out to the waves, which is not prohibited by the competition's rules. Bethany trains for the competition while rekindling her friendship with Alana. She enters the national championship. During the competition, she performs respectably, though she is still chasing third place. Suddenly, with only minutes left on the clock, the waves die down and all the surfers can only loiter, waiting for the waves to start back up. Tom's belief in his daughter's instinct is proven when she is the only one to sense a big wave forming, and she alone paddles out. When it forms, the others cannot get out in time and she catches it just as the horn sounds. If it is in time, she will win, but the judges rule that the time has expired. Malina is the winner, but she has finally gotten over her differences with Bethany, inviting her up on the platform to share her victory.

Subsequently, Bethany lets the reporters interview her. One asks her what she would do if given the chance to undo the loss of her arm. She says that she would still lose it because she can embrace more people now than she ever could with both.

Cast

Production
Plans for a biopic film about Hamilton had existed months after her shark attack and her subsequent recovery in 2004. During Hamilton's media attention, the father of Bethany's friends Chantilly and Tiffany, Roy "Dutch" Hofstetter, became the Hamilton family's media manager. Hofstetter, in February 2004, envisioned a film based on Bethany's experience, provisionally titled The Bethany Hamilton Story. Bethany published her biographical book Soul Surfer in 2004, and BBC reported that a film about her life was scheduled to begin filming in January 2005. Production did not begin as anticipated, and Time reported in July 2006 that production was scheduled for later in the year.

Though production had not begun by the end of 2006, in January 2007 Sean McNamara was announced to be directing the biographical film. While Hamilton had a series of surfing successes, turning pro in 2007, McNamara and producer David Brookwell with her manager Roy "Dutch" Hofstetter sought more material for the film. The book was considered "a straightforward account" that was targeted to Christian readers, so the filmmakers met with the Hamilton family to determine if there were any unpublished conflicts that could be highlighted in the film. They discovered that the incident had strained the family, that family members questioned their Christian faith, and that Bethany Hamilton struggled with her physical appearance and how boys would perceive her. The media attention on the family was described by Brookwell as "a second shark attack" that had made their lives uncomfortably public.

McNamara, Brookwell, Hofstetter and Douglas Schwartz spent several years raising money for production. The director wrote an adapted screenplay with Michael Berk, Douglas Schwartz and Deborah Schwartz. Additional uncredited writing was performed by Ron Bass, Jen Smolka and Kara Holden. Before the film entered production, Sony Pictures Worldwide Acquisitions acquired distribution rights for North America and most other territories. The production companies Mandalay Vision, Brookwell McNamara Entertainment and Life's a Beach Entertainment collaborated for the production, with Enticing Entertainment and Island Film Group providing financing. Bethany Hamilton chose with her mother AnnaSophia Robb to portray her, as well as Sonia Balmores Chung and Jeremy Sumpter to play Malina and Alana's brother, Byron. In February 2010, Robb was announced to be part of the film as Bethany Hamilton, along with Dennis Quaid and Helen Hunt who were cast as Bethany's parents. Singer Carrie Underwood, in her feature film debut, was cast as a church youth leader. All the surfing scenes after the shark attack were done by Hamilton herself. Filming began the same month in Hawaii. Principal photography and second-unit aerial work took place for 40 days; cinematographer John R. Leonetti shot on 35mm film. During filming, Robb wore a green sleeve on her arm so visual effects could be included later. Though McNamara was editing the film by May 2010, additional filming took place in August 2010 in Tahiti. During post-production, the VFX company Engine Room worked on 450 arm-removal shots, digitally inserting the upper arm residuum in place of Robb's green sleeve. The Hamilton family was involved in the choice of music.

Release
In July 2010, USA Today reported Soul Surfer as one of several faith-based films similar to The Blind Side, Get Low, Like Dandelion Dust, and Jumping the Broom. In September 2010, independent studio FilmDistrict was launched, and the company formed a partnership with TriStar Pictures to release Soul Surfer.

Prior to the film's commercial release, it was screened for religious leaders. A scene in which Dennis Quaid's character reads the Bible in the hospital at his daughter's bedside had the words "Holy Bible" digitally removed from the cover. Bethany Hamilton's father said that David Zelon, an executive at Mandalay Pictures, lobbied to reduce the Soul Surfers Christian elements so the film could appeal more to non-Christian audiences. The Hamilton family objected, and the words "Holy Bible" were restored in the scene in a follow-up screening. Another debated scene was one in which Carrie Underwood's character, a church youth leader, quotes biblical scripture (Jeremiah 29:11). While those involved with the film were fine with the verse, they did not want the scene to explicitly indicate that its origin was the Bible. Their stance was challenged, and the scene indicates the verse being from the Bible. The Hollywood Reporter cited the dust-up as an example of Hollywood learning to appeal to the faith-based community while still attracting secular audiences. The Blind Side, which accomplished both, had grossed  in the United States and Canada.

Box office
It grossed  over its opening weekend, ranking fourth at the box office. Sony Pictures reported that 80% of the audience was female and that 56% were under 25 years old.

Critical reception
Soul Surfer has received mixed reviews from critics. Review aggregation website Rotten Tomatoes gives a score of 46% based on reviews from 101 critics, with an average rating of 5.3/10. The site's consensus is: "There's an amazing true story at the heart of Soul Surfer -- and unfortunately, it's drowned by waves of Hollywood cheese." On Metacritic — which assigns a weighted mean score — the film has a score of 53 out of 100 based on 27 critics, indicating "mixed or average reviews".

Roger Ebert of the Chicago Sun-Times was mildly positive in his review, giving the film two-and-a-half stars out of four and writing "Soul Surfer is a wholesome movie, intended as inspirational. Whether it will cheer viewers who are not as capable as Bethany is an excellent question. AnnaSophia Robb is a convincing, cheerful heroine. Dennis Quaid and Helen Hunt, as Bethany's parents, are stalwart and supportive, although the script indeed leaves them with no other choice." 
Owen Gleiberman of Entertainment Weekly gave the film a B grade, writing "[t]he more cynical viewers out there may say, 'Not for me.' But Soul Surfer, while formulaic in design, is an authentic and heartfelt movie." S. Jhoanna Robledo of Common Sense Media gave the film three stars out of five, writing "Yes, it's a message movie, but the message burrows deep enough under your skin to make the movie, given its utter conventionality, unexpectedly stirring."

Despite mixed critical reception, it was a hit among audiences; CinemaScore polls reports that the average grade moviegoers gave it was a rare A+.

Home media
Soul Surfer was released on DVD and Blu-ray on August 2, 2011 by Sony Pictures Home Entertainment.

Accolades

Further reading

See also
Long Journey Back, a 1978 film about a female amputee's recovery after her leg is severed in a bus accident

References

External links

 
 
 
 
 
 

American biographical films
American teen films
Sea adventure films
Affirm Films films
Brookwell McNamara Entertainment films
FilmDistrict films
Films scored by Marco Beltrami
Films about amputees
Films about Christianity
Films about evangelicalism
Films about sharks
Films based on biographies
Films directed by Sean McNamara
Films set in Hawaii
Films set in Thailand
Films set in 2003
Films set in 2004
Films shot in Hawaii
Films shot in Tahiti
Mandalay Pictures films
American surfing films
TriStar Pictures films
Films about women's sports
American children's drama films
2010s English-language films
2010s American films
American sports drama films
Films about disability